Have Gun – Will Travel is an American Western series that was produced and originally broadcast by CBS on both television and radio from 1957 through 1963. The television version of the series starring Richard Boone was rated number three or number four in the Nielsen ratings every year of its first four seasons, and it is one of the few shows in television history to spawn a successful radio version. That radio series starring John Dehner debuted November 23, 1958, more than a year after the premiere of its televised counterpart.

Production
Have Gun – Will Travel was created by Sam Rolfe and Herb Meadow and produced by Frank Pierson, Don Ingalls, Robert Sparks, and Julian Claman. Of the 225 episodes of the television series, 24 were written by Gene Roddenberry. Other major contributors included Bruce Geller, Harry Julian Fink, Don Brinkley, and Irving Wallace. Andrew V. McLaglen directed 101 episodes, and 28 were directed by series star Richard Boone.

Premise
This series follows the adventures of a man calling himself "Paladin" (played by Richard Boone on television and voiced by John Dehner on radio), taking his name from that of the foremost knights in Charlemagne's court. He is a gentleman investigator/gunfighter who travels around the Old West working as a mercenary for people who hire him to solve their problems.

Although Paladin charges steep fees to clients who can afford to hire him, typically $1000 per job, he provides his services for free to poor people who need his help. Like many Westerns, the television show was set in a time vaguely indicated to be some years after the American Civil War. The radio show announced the year of the story that followed in the opening of each episode.

The season-five television episode, "A Drop of Blood", gives the specific date of July 3, 1879. In the 14th and 17th ("Lazarus", March 6 and 7, 1875) episodes of season five, it is 1875.

Title
The title is a variation on a cliche used in personal advertisements in newspapers such as The Times, indicating that the advertiser is ready for anything.  It has been used this way from the early 20th century.

A trope common in theatrical advertising at the time was "Have tux, will travel" (originally from comedian Bob Hope in 1954), and CBS has claimed this was the specific inspiration for the writer Herb Meadow. The television show popularized the phrase in the 1950s and 1960s, and many variations have been used as titles for other works, including the 1958 science-fiction novel Have Space Suit—Will Travel by Robert A. Heinlein.

Characters

Paladin

Paladin prefers to settle the difficulties clients bring his way without violence, but this rarely happens. When forced, he excels in fisticuffs. Under his real name, which is never revealed, he was a dueling champion of some renown. Paladin is a graduate of the United States Military Academy at West Point and a veteran of the American Civil War, in which he served as a Union cavalry officer.

His permanent place of residence is the Hotel Carlton in San Francisco, where he lives the life of a successful businessman and bon vivant, wearing elegant custom-made suits, consuming fine wine, playing the piano, and attending the opera and other cultural events. He is an expert chess player, poker player, and swordsman. He is skilled in Chinese martial arts, and is seen in several episodes receiving instruction and training with a Kung Fu master in San Francisco. He is highly educated, able to quote classic literature, philosophy, and case law, and speaks several languages. He is also president of the San Francisco Stock Exchange Club.

When out working, Paladin changes into all-black Western-style clothing. His primary weapon is a custom-made, first-generation .45 caliber Colt Single Action Army Cavalry Model revolver with an unusual rifled barrel, carried in a black leather holster (with a platinum chess knight symbol facing the rear), hanging from a black leather gunbelt. He also carries a lever-action Marlin rifle (with a platinum chess knight symbol facing the rear seen in "The Hunt") strapped to his saddle. In some episodes, he has a two-shot Remington derringer concealed under his belt; in other episodes, it is a single-shot Merrimack Arms "Southerner" derringer.

Paladin gives out a business card imprinted with "Have Gun Will Travel" and an engraving of a white knight chess piece, which evokes the proverbial white knight and the knight in shining armor. A closeup of this card is used as a title card between scenes in the program.

A Man Called Paladin, Frank C. Robertson's novelization of the season-six premiere "Genesis", gives Paladin's real name as Clay Alexander.

Other recurring characters
The one other major semiregular character in the show is the Chinese bellhop at the Carlton Hotel, known as Hey Boy (real name Kim Chan or Kim Chang); in the first season in the episode called "Hey Boy's Revenge", the character Hey Boy is sought by Paladin under the name Kim Chan, which is written on a piece of paper and shown on screen. As the episode continues, Hey Boy is referred to (verbally) five times as Kim Chan and then on the sixth incident Paladin states Hey Boy's name as Kim Chang and thereafter he is referred to as Kim Chang every time. No explanation is given for the name change. Hey Boy is played by Kam Tong. According to author and historian Martin Grams Jr., Hey Boy is featured in all but the fourth of the show's six seasons, with the character of Hey Girl, played by Lisa Lu, replacing Hey Boy for season four while Kam Tong worked on the Mr. Garlund television series. Lisa Lu had previously played Hey Boy's sister, Kim Li, in "Hey Boy's Revenge".

Character actor Olan Soule appears across all six seasons in 10 episodes of Have Gun – Will Travel as an employee of the Carlton Hotel, usually identified as the manager/desk clerk.  The character's name is inconsistent, being given as "Cartwright" in two episodes, and "Matthews" in another.  Tony Regan also appears as an unnamed desk clerk in over a dozen episodes, between seasons two and five.  Hal Needham, later a noted director, worked on the show as a stunt performer and can be seen as a bit-part player (in a wide variety of roles) in nearly 50 episodes.

Notable guest stars

Guest stars included:

 Claude Akins
 Jack Albertson
 Martin Balsam
 Edward Binns
 Robert Blake
 Dan Blocker
 Charles Bronson
 Kathie Browne
 Edgar Buchanan
 Dyan Cannon
 John Carradine
 Lon Chaney Jr.
 James Coburn
 Mike Connors
 William Conrad
 James Craig
 Angie Dickinson
 Buddy Ebsen
 Jack Elam
 Peter Falk
 James Franciscus
 Peggy Ann Garner
Virginia Gregg
 Murray Hamilton
 Ben Johnson
 DeForest Kelley
 George Kennedy
 Werner Klemperer
 Patric Knowles
 June Lockhart
 Jack Lord
 Strother Martin
 Victor McLaglen
 James Mitchum
 Harry Morgan
Jeanette Nolan
 Warren Oates
 Odetta
 Suzanne Pleshette
 Sydney Pollack
 Vincent Price
 Denver Pyle
 Pernell Roberts
 Janice Rule
 Albert Salmi
 Harry Dean Stanton
 Lee Van Cleef
 Jack Weston
 Stuart Whitman

Opening sequence

Originally, each show opened with the same 45-second visual. Over a slow, four-note-repeat backbeat score, a tight shot of Paladin's chess knight emblem centered in a black background is seen, before the view widens to show the emblem affixed to Paladin's holster, with Paladin in his trademark costume seen from waist level in profile. Then, as he draws his revolver from the holster, the four-note-repeat backbeat fades to a light, almost harp-like strumming. He cocks the hammer, and then rotates the gun to point the barrel at the viewer for 10 seconds, often delivering a line of dialogue from the coming episode, after which the pistol is uncocked and holstered briskly. As the weapon is reholstered and the view tightens to show only the chess knight, again, the four-note-repeat backbeat returns.

As only the chess knight emblem in a black background is back, the name "RICHARD BOONE" appears across the screen for about 5 seconds. The name fades out and immediately the words "in HAVE GUN – WILL TRAVEL" fade in, again for about 5 seconds. Boone's name and the show's title are accompanied by a four-note "stinger" that overshadows the four-note-repeat. The "stinger" is roughly the same as that heard when Paladin's business card is flashed on screen (in almost every episode). The words fade away after those 5 seconds, leaving only the chess knight emblem against the black background, and the four-note-repeat fades out. This opening then fades out and the show fades in on its opening scene.

A later version of the opening sequence (seasons three to six) has a long-range shot, with Paladin in a full-body profile silhouette, and he fast-draws the revolver, dropping into a slight crouch as he turns, pointing at the camera. After the dubbed-over line, he straightens as he shoves the firearm into his holster. This silhouette visual remained for the run of the series. In later episodes, the teaser line was dropped; as seen in many of the episodes of the final two seasons' opening titles, when Paladin crouches and points his gun at the camera, first "RICHARD BOONE", and then "HAVE GUN – WILL TRAVEL" would appear as before, and Boone would reholster his gun as the words faded out. Due to the networks not always airing episodes in the order they were filmed, the omission of the voice-over dialogue was inconsistent for some of the episodes, as seen in the opening titles. Season six did have the most opening titles without the voice-over dialogue, especially as the season progressed, again as seen when the episodes opened.

Τrademark infringement litigation
In 1974, a rodeo performer named Victor De Costa won a federal court judgment against CBS for trademark infringement, successfully arguing that he had created the Paladin character and the ideas used in the show, and that CBS had used them without permission. For example, at his rodeo appearances he always dressed in black, called himself the "Paladin", handed out hundreds of business cards featuring a chess piece logo along with the phrase "Have gun will travel", and carried a concealed derringer pistol. A year later, an appellate court overturned the lower court ruling on the basis that the plaintiff had failed to prove that likelihood of confusion had existed in the minds of the public—a necessary requirement for a suit over trademark infringement. In 1977, De Costa was awarded a federal trademark for the Paladin character.

De Costa kept pursuing his legal options, and in 1991—more than 30 years after his first lawsuit was originally filed—a federal jury awarded DeCosta $3.5 million from Viacom International, by then a CBS subsidiary, which has distributed the show's reruns in defiance of De Costa's registered trademark, ordering Viacom to pay DeCosta $1 million for his loss and $2.5 million in punitive damages. Rhode Island District Judge Ernest C. Torres blocked the redistribution of the Paladin show by Viacom.

De Costa died on 29 January 1993 at the age of 84, before he could receive the award.

Filming locations

Unlike many Westerns, entire episodes were filmed outdoors and away from the Old West Street set on Irving Street just below Melrose Avenue, the home of Filmaster television production company. Filmaster was located across the street from, later becoming part of, Paramount Studios' backlot. The area is now enclosed in the independent Kingsley Productions studio lot encompassing a city block. Beginning in season four, filming locations were often given in the closing credits. Locations included Bishop and Lone Pine, California; an area now known as Paladin Estates between Bend and Sisters, Oregon; and the Abbott Ranch near Prineville, Oregon.

Music
The program's opening was a four-note motif composed and conducted by Bernard Herrmann. For the opening theme, Herrmann reused a short sequence he had previously composed for the 1951 movie On Dangerous Ground, starring Robert Ryan and Ida Lupino. The "Have Gun – Will Travel" theme (and fragments of incidental music also used in the television series) are featured in a chase scene across snowy fields; at the 35:25 mark of the film, the actual "Have Gun – Will Travel" opening theme is played in recognizable form, although the scoring is slightly different from the better-known television version.

The show's closing song, "The Ballad of Paladin", was written by Johnny Western (who had a role in season one, episode 35, "The Return of Dr. Thackeray"), Richard Boone, and program creator Sam Rolfe, and was performed by Western. In the first season, the closing song was a reprise of the opening theme. In syndication, the first (premise) episode concludes with the Johnny Western ballad. The rest of the first-season episodes play a reprise of the opening theme; although the theme song was used in closing at least four times in season one, including episodes 33 and 34.

In the second season, the song was the only closing music. In the third season, a new lyric was added to the five-line "The Ballad of Paladin", making it six lines long. In 1962–1963, the final season, the song's lyrics were cut to four lines, the original fourth and added sixth being dropped. This occurred because the production credits for writer, producer, and director were pulled from the closing credits to appear over the opening sequences. However, in the season-si episode "Sweet Lady in the Moon" (episode 26, 1963), the ballad was played complete over the closing credits.

Johnny Western has sung a fully recorded version, opening with the refrain and including a second verse never heard on the television series.

When showing episodes with Paladin at the Hotel Carlton in San Francisco, beautiful background music is often played. That instrumental was "Darling Nelly Gray", which is a 19th-century popular song written and composed by Benjamin Hanby.

Broadcast history and ratings

September 1957 – April 1963: Saturdays at 9:30 pm

Ratings:
 October 1957 – April 1958: #4 – 33.7
 October 1958 – April 1959: #3 – 34.3
 October 1959 – April 1960: #3 – 34.7
 October 1960 – April 1961: #3 – 30.9
 October 1961 – April 1962: #29 – 22.2
 October 1962 – April 1963: #29 – 20.8

Awards
The television show was nominated for three Emmy Awards. These were for Best Actor in a Leading Role (Continuing Character) in a Dramatic Series, for Richard Boone (1959); Best Western Series (1959); and Outstanding Performance by an Actor in a Series (Lead or Support), for Richard Boone (1960).

In 1957, Gene Roddenberry received the Writers Guild of America Award for Best Original Script for the episode "Helen of Abajinian".

Writers
Many of the writers who worked on Have Gun – Will Travel went on to gain fame elsewhere. Gene Roddenberry created Star Trek, Bruce Geller created Mission: Impossible, Samuel A. Peeples created The Tall Man, Custer, and Lancer, and Harold Jack Bloom created Boone's later series Hec Ramsey and the 1970s medical-adventure series Emergency! Harry Julian Fink is one of the writers who created Dirty Harry (the opening title and theme scene of the 1973 Dirty Harry sequel Magnum Force features a Paladin-like sequence of a handgun being slowly cocked and then finally pointed toward the camera, with a potent line of dialogue). Sam Peckinpah wrote one episode, "The Singer", which aired in 1958. Other notable writers who contributed an episode include Gene L. Coon, Richard Matheson, Charles Beaumont, Laurence Heath, and Fred Freiberger. Both Star Trek and Mission: Impossible were produced by Desilu Productions and later Paramount Television, which also now owns the rights to Have Gun – Will Travel through its successor company, CBS Television Distribution.

Franchise in other media

Radio show

The Have Gun – Will Travel radio show broadcast 106 episodes on the CBS Radio Network between November 23, 1958, and November 27, 1960. It was one of the last radio dramas featuring continuing characters and one of only a handful of American radio adaptations of a television series. John Dehner (a regular on the radio series version of Gunsmoke) played Paladin, and Ben Wright usually (but not always) played Hey Boy. Virginia Gregg played Miss Wong, Hey Boy's girlfriend, before the television series featured the character of Hey Girl. Unlike the small-screen version, this medium usually had a tag scene at the Carlton at both the beginning and the end of the episode. Initially, the episodes were adaptations of the television program as broadcast earlier the same week, but eventually, original stories were produced, including a finale ("From Here to Boston", "Inheritance", and "Goodbye, Paladin") in which Paladin leaves San Francisco, perhaps forever, to claim an inheritance back east. The radio version was written by producer/writer Roy Winsor.

Books
Three novels were based on the television show, all with the title of the show.  The first was a hardback written for children, published by Whitman in 1959 in a series of novelizations of television shows. It was written by Barlow Meyers and illustrated by Nichols S. Firfires. The second was a 1960 paperback original, written for adults by Noel Loomis.  The last book, A Man Called Paladin, written by Frank C. Robertson and published in 1963 by Collier-Macmillan in hardback and paperback, is based on the television episode "Genesis" by Frank Rolfe.

This novel is the only source wherein a name is given to the Paladin character, Clay Alexander, but fans of the series do not consider this name canonical. Dell Comics published a number of comic books with original stories based on the television series. In 2000, Martin Grams, Jr. and Les Rayburn self-published the 500-page trade paperback, The Have Gun – Will Travel Companion, documenting the history of the radio and television series.

Film
In 1997, a film version of the television series was announced. John Travolta was named as a possible star in the Warner Bros. production, which was scripted by Larry Ferguson and to be directed by The Fugitive director Andrew Davis. The film was never made.

In 2006, a Have Gun – Will Travel film starring rapper Eminem was announced to be in production, but the film does not hold an official confirmed release date. Paramount Pictures extended an 18-month option on the television series and planned to transform the character of Paladin into a modern-day bounty hunter. Eminem was expected to work on the soundtrack.

Television reboot

In August 2012, several venues announced that David Mamet was developing a reboot of the television series for CBS.

In other television series
In the television series Maverick, season two, episode 16, "Gun Shy", a send-up of the television series Gunsmoke, Marshal Mort Dooley, the marshal of Elwood, Kansas, comments that several strange people have been passing through his town lately, specifically referring to "that gunslinger who handed out business cards." A subsequent comedic Maverick episode titled "The Cats of Paradise" features a black-clad character obviously based on Paladin, albeit without using the name. Both episodes star James Garner.

During the run of the series, Richard Boone was a guest one night on the popular CBS game show What's My Line? as the celebrity "mystery guest", while the panelists were blindfolded, wearing his black Paladin cowboy outfit including the hat.

In the 1956 cartoon "To Hare Is Human:, Wile E Coyote's business card reads "Wile E Coyote Genius  Have Brain Will Travel
In the 1962 Tom and Jerry cartoon "Tall in the Trap", Tom cat rolls into town on spurs with a card reading "Tall in the Trap" showing a mousetrap on a knight chess piece.
In the third episode of the seventh season of Archer ("Deadly Prep," April 14, 2016) the titular character is seen cleaning his weapon as he sings the theme song from Have Gun - Will Travel.

Home media
All of the episodes were released on VHS by Columbia House. CBS DVD (distributed by Paramount) has released all six seasons of Have Gun – Will Travel on DVD in Region 1. Season siv, volumes one and two were first released on May 7, 2013.

On May 10, 2016, CBS DVD was to release Have Gun – Will Travel – The Complete Series on DVD in Region 1.

In the second-season DVD, two episodes are mislabeled. On disk three, the episode titled "Treasure Trail" is actually "Hunt the Man Down", and on disk four, "Hunt the Man Down" is "Treasure Trail"; the "Wire Paladin" in each case refers to the other episode.

Cultural influences

 Boon, a hit British Drama series, was heavily influenced by Have Gun – Will Travel. The series followed the adventures an ex-fireman who was invalided out of the service and became a modern-day hero. Of Have Gun – Will Travel'''s influence, co-creator Jim Hill said: "Boon had been derived from an American TV series from the 1950s that Bill Stair and I both watched and liked. It was called Have Gun – Will Travel – a troubleshooting cowboy answered distress calls. He was called Paladin and was played by the actor Richard Boone. We dropped the E and we had BOON – a modern-day trouble shooter on a motorbike instead of a steed." Boon ran from 1986 to 1992, with a special one-off episode in 1995.
 Have Space Suit – Will Travel (1958) is a "space opera" novel by Robert A. Heinlein. The narrator is called to space to do the typical hero's job of defending humanity and saving the earth.
 Have 'Twangy' Guitar Will Travel (1958) is an album by guitarist Duane Eddy.
 Have Guitar Will Travel (1960) is an album by guitarist and vocalist Bo Diddley.
 Have Guitar, Will Travel (2009) is an album by guitarist Joe Perry.  The accompanying tour also used the name.
 "Have Love, Will Travel" is a song written and recorded in 1959 by Richard Berry.
 In a scene in Stand By Me, the main characters sing the show's closing theme song as a way of evoking that film's era (it is set in late 1959); songwriter Johnny Western successfully sued the producers for not securing his permission beforehand. This scene is spoofed in the "Stand by Me" segment of the Family Guy episode "Three Kings".
 The Tom and Jerry cartoon "Tall in the Trap" (1962, directed by Gene Deitch) was a parody of Have Gun – Will Travel.
 A feature of Frank Zappa's 1970 tour's performances was the "Paladin Routine", a brief improvised comedy sketch based on the Have Gun – Will Travel characters, culminating in a vocalization of the music from the series' opening-credit sequence. One such performance is documented on the bootleg album Freaks & Motherfu*#@%! (later released as part of Beat the Boots).
 In the third season, episode three of Downton Abbey, aired January 6, 2013, in what appears to be an anachronism, the character Lady Cora tells her husband, "I'm American: have gun, will travel", but the general phrase "Have X will travel" does date back to the show's time period.
 "Have Time, Will Travel" is an episode of The Wacky Adventures of Ronald McDonald.
 Got Dust, Will Travel, a mission from Saints Row 2 Have Mask, Will Travel is the title of the second part of the Mask/Ace Ventura crossover and the final episode of the latter's second season.
 In the 1972–74 series Hec Ramsey, set in New Prospect, Oklahoma, in 1901, Boone is an older former gunfighter turned forensic criminologist. At one point, Ramsey denies that in his younger days as a gunfighter, he worked under the name Paladin. The origin of this myth is Boone's remark in an interview, "Hec Ramsey is Paladin – only fatter."  Naturally, he merely meant the characters had certain similarities: Ramsey, for his part, was practically buffoonish, imparting a measure of humor to Hec Ramsey missing from the sterner, more erudite Paladin.
 In the two-part 1991 TV miniseries The Gambler Returns: The Luck of the Draw, a poker game is played by the rules of "the late Mr. Paladin" in the Carlton Hotel where the recently deceased Paladin usually stayed; the film featured numerous cowboy actors from 1950s television series playing their earlier roles in cameo appearances three decades later, along with Claude Akins as President Theodore Roosevelt turning up at the game to assist in memorializing Paladin.
 In the 1985 Star Trek novel Ishmael by Barbara Hambly, in which the Enterprise travels back in time, Spock plays chess against Paladin during a visit to San Francisco.
 In the 2013 fan-created series Star Trek Continues episode "Pilgrim of Eternity", visual effects artist Doug Drexler played the part of Paladin in a Holodeck creation. Drexler cited the special specifications of Paladin's revolver to an impressed Captain Kirk (Vic Mignogna).
 As a homage to Boone's character, in the Pathfinder Roleplaying Game, the Paladin features an archetype named "Holy Gun", whose abilities are succinctly described as "Have Gun".
 The 2019 video game The Outer Worlds has a side quest titled "Makes Space Suits, Won't Travel" about a fashion designer in a space colony who sends the protagonist out on errands for her.
 Desmond Bagley's 1968 novel The Vivero Letter has a moment when the protagonist/narrator, thinking about what he is getting into, ironically describes himself as an "adventurer at large – 'have gun, will travel'." Then he notes that he does not have a gun and said, "I doubted whether I could use one effectively, anyway."

See also
 List of Have Gun – Will Travel episodes

References

Bibliography
 Have Gun – Will Travel Companion'' by Martin Grams, Jr. and Les Rayburn. OTR Publishing, 2001. .

External links

 
 Have Gun – Will Travel at CVTA
 Have Gun – Will Travel  at the Museum of Broadcast Communications
 Have Gun – Will Travel Tribute Site
 The Entire Radio Series for download
 Web-site for the Have Gun – Will Travel paperback book
 Have Gun – Will Travel: The Radio Series by author Martin Grams, Jr.
 "Ballad of Paladin" (closing theme) – written by Johnny Western, Richard Boone, and Sam Rolfe and performed by Johnny Western
 Zoot Radio, free old time radio show downloads of Have Gun – Will Travel.
 Behind-the-scenes production photo Collection of Stephen Lodge.

1950s Western (genre) television series
CBS original programming
American radio dramas
Television series by CBS Studios
Television shows set in San Francisco
1957 American television series debuts
1963 American television series endings
Television shows adapted into comics
Television shows adapted into novels
Snowclones
1950s American radio programs
1960s American radio programs
1958 radio programme debuts
1960 radio programme endings
Black-and-white American television shows
CBS Radio programs
1960s Western (genre) television series
1950s neologisms
Quotations from radio
Quotations from television
Western (genre) radio series
Television series set in the 19th century